Warintorn Panhakarn ( or nicknamed Great (เกรท) is a Thai actor and model. He is best known for his roles in the television dramas such as The Sixth Sense (2012) and Khun Chai Taratorn (2013).

Early life 
Warintorn Panhakan was born at Lom Sak Hospital, Lom Sak District, Phetchabun Province. He is the eldest child in a family of three. His has 1 sister and 1 younger brother, Chayaphol Panhakarn is a singer for being a contestant on the KPN Awards. His father served as a police officer. As for her mother, she runs a gold shop. Warintorn graduated from high school at Princess Chulabhorn Science High School Lopburi. He holds a bachelor's degree from the Faculty of Fine Arts (now the Faculty of Art and Design) in Interior Design at Rangsit University.

Career 
Warintorn entered the entertainment industry by participating in the project to find "Jadet". After the project ended, he received many advertisements.  Then he joined the Guy's Challenge project, making himself more well known in Thailand.
In 2008, he made his acting debut in the drama Ruk Ter Yord Ruk, in which he played a villain character.
In 2009, he played the leading role in a TV drama Sai Sueb Delivery with Yard Yardthip.
Warintorn is best known for playing the role of Khun Chai Taratorn in the 2013 drama series Suphapburut Juthathep.

Filmography

Television

MC
 Television 
 2012 : Thailand's Most Famous ขวัญใจไทยแลนด์ (Judge)
 2014 : The Angel นางฟ้าติดปีก (Judge)

 Online 
 2018 : Khon Dee Tee Nhai On Air YouTube:KhonDeeTeeNhai Official With Premmanat Suwannanon, Pakorn Chatborirak, Teeradetch Metawarayut, Jirayu Tangsrisuk
 2020 : Great Talk : On Air YouTube::Great Man Can Do (MC)

References

External links 

Living people
1985 births
Warintorn Panhakarn
Warintorn Panhakarn
Warintorn Panhakarn
Thai television personalities
Warintorn Panhakarn